Joseph Louis Gay-Lussac (6 December 1778 – 9 May 1850) was a French chemist and physicist. He is known mostly for his discovery that water is made of two parts hydrogen and one part oxygen (with Alexander von Humboldt), for two laws related to gases, and for his work on alcohol–water mixtures, which led to the degrees Gay-Lussac used to measure alcoholic beverages in many countries.

Biography 
Gay-Lussac was born at Saint-Léonard-de-Noblat in the present-day department of Haute-Vienne.

The father of Joseph Louis Gay, Anthony Gay, son of a doctor, was a lawyer and prosecutor and worked as a judge in Noblat Bridge. Father of two sons and three daughters, he owned much of the Lussac village and usually added the name of this hamlet of the Haute-Vienne to his name, following a custom of the Ancien Régime. Towards the year 1803, father and son finally adopted the name Gay-Lussac. During the Revolution, on behalf of the Law of Suspects, his father, former king's attorney, was imprisoned in  Saint Léonard from 1793 to 1794.

He received his early education at the hands of the Catholic Abbey of Bourdeix, though later in life became an atheist. In the care of the Abbot of Dumonteil he began his education in Paris, finally entering the École Polytechnique in 1798.

Three years later, Gay-Lussac transferred to the École des Ponts et Chaussées, and shortly afterward was assigned to C. L. Berthollet as his assistant. In 1804 he was appointed répétiteur (demonstrator) to Antoine François Fourcroy at the École Polytechnique, whom he succeeded in 1809 as professor of chemistry. From 1809 to 1832, he was also the professor of physics at the Sorbonne, a post which he only resigned for the chair of chemistry at the Jardin des Plantes. In 1821, he was elected a foreign member of the Royal Swedish Academy of Sciences. In 1831 he was elected to represent Haute-Vienne in the chamber of deputies, and in 1839 he entered the chamber of peers. He was elected a Foreign Honorary Member of the American Academy of Arts and Sciences in 1832.

Gay-Lussac married Geneviève-Marie-Joseph Rojot in 1809. He had first met her when she worked as a linen draper's shop assistant and was studying a chemistry textbook under the counter. He fathered five children, of whom the eldest (Jules) became assistant to Justus Liebig in Giessen. Some publications by Jules are mistaken as his father's today since they share the same first initial (J. Gay-Lussac).

Gay-Lussac died in Paris, and his grave is there at Père Lachaise Cemetery. His name is one of the 72 names inscribed on the Eiffel Tower.

Achievements 

 1802 – Gay-Lussac first published the law that at constant pressure, the volume of any gas increases in proportion to its absolute temperature. Since in his paper announcing the law he cited earlier unpublished work on this subject by Jacques Charles, the law is usually called Charles's Law, though some sources use the expression Gay-Lussac's Law.  This law was independently and nearly simultaneously stated by John Dalton.
He wanted to collect samples of the air at different heights to record differences in temperature and moisture.
 1805 – Together with his friend and scientific collaborator Alexander von Humboldt, he discovered that the composition of the atmosphere does not change with decreasing pressure (increasing altitude). They also discovered that water is formed by two parts of hydrogen and one part of oxygen (by volume).
 1808 – He was the co-discoverer of boron.
 1808 - Discovery and publication of the law of combining volumes.
 1810 – In collaboration with Louis Thenard, he developed a method for quantitative elemental analysis by measuring the CO2 and O2 evolved by reaction with potassium chlorate. He also summarised the equation of alcoholic fermentation.
 1811 – He recognized iodine as a new element, described its properties, and suggested the name iode.
 1815 – He synthesized cyanogen, determined its empirical formula and named it.
 1824 – He developed an improved version of the burette that included a side arm, and coined the terms "pipette" and "burette" in an 1824 paper about the standardization of indigo solutions.

Honors
 In Paris, a street and a hotel near the Sorbonne are named after him as are a square and a street in his birthplace, Saint-Léonard-de-Noblat.
 In Australia, the "Gay-Lussac Room" at AB Mauri STC, Sydney was named after him in honour of his work with yeast fermentation.

Academic lineage

Publications 
Chemistry courses of the École Polytechnique, Vol.1&2
Lessons of Physics, Faculty of Sciences in Paris, (November 6, 1827, March 18, 1828)

See also 
Brin process
Joule expansion

References

Further reading 

 Joseph Louis Gay-Lussac, French chemist (1778–1850) from the Encyclopædia Britannica, 10th Edition (1902)
 Rue Gay-Lussac, Paris
 Gay-Lussac's article (1809) "On the combination of gaseous substances", online and analyzed on BibNum (for English, click 'à télécharger').

École Polytechnique alumni
École des Ponts ParisTech alumni
Corps des ponts
1778 births
1850 deaths
People from Haute-Vienne
Academic staff of the University of Paris
Burials at Père Lachaise Cemetery
Discoverers of chemical elements
Members of the French Academy of Sciences
Members of the Royal Swedish Academy of Sciences
Fellows of the American Academy of Arts and Sciences
Recipients of the Pour le Mérite (civil class)
French atheists
19th-century French chemists
19th-century French physicists
Foreign Members of the Royal Society
Boron
Flight altitude record holders
French aviation record holders
Fluid dynamicists